W series or W-series may refer to:

 Dodge W series, 4x4 versions of Dodge D series
 GMC W series or Chevrolet W series – versions of the Isuzu Elf trucks
 Kawasaki W series, motorcycles
 NRIST W-series UAV, Chinese unmanned aerial vehicle line
 Sony Vaio W series, netbook computers
 Sony Walkman W Series, wearable MP3 players
 Sony Ericsson W series, Sony Ericsson Walkman phones
 ThinkPad W series, Lenovo laptop computers
 W series (satellites), geosynchronous communication satellites
 W Series (championship), single-seater racing championship

See also

 W (disambiguation), for series named "W"
 V series (disambiguation)
 X series (disambiguation)